The 1953 Northwestern State Demons football team was an American football team that represented Northwestern State College of Louisiana (now known as Northwestern State University) as a member of the Gulf States Conference during the 1953 college football season. In their 20th year under head coach Harry Turpin, the team compiled an overall record of 6–2 record with a mark of 5–1 in conference play, sharing the GSC title with Louisiana Tech and Southeastern Louisiana.

Schedule

References

Northwestern State
Northwestern State Demons football seasons
Northwestern State Demons football